The men's discus throw event at the 1932 Olympic Games took place August 3. Eighteen athletes from 11 nations competed. The 1930 Olympic Congress in Berlin had reduced the limit from 4 athletes per NOC to 3 athletes. The event was won by John Anderson of the United States, the nation's third consecutive and sixth overall victory in the men's discus throw. Henri LaBorde took silver, marking the first time since 1908 that the same nation had the top two discus throwers. Paul Winter was the bronze medalist, earning France's first discus medal. Finland's four-Games podium streak ended, while the United States extended its streak to all nine appearances of the event.

Background

This was the ninth appearance of the event, which is one of 12 athletics events to have been held at every Summer Olympics. The only returning finalist from 1928 was fifth-place finisher John Anderson of the United States. Anderson had won the 1932 AAU competition as well as the U.S. Olympic trials, beating world record holder and 1930 and 1931 AAU winner Paul Jessup.

Argentina and South Africa each made their debut in the men's discus throw. The United States made its ninth appearance, having competed in every edition of the Olympic men's discus throw to date.

Competition format

The competition continued to use the single, divided-final format in use since 1896. Each athlete received three throws, with the top six receiving an additional three throws.

Records

These were the standing world and Olympic records (in metres) prior to the 1932 Summer Olympics.

John Anderson and Henri LaBorde each bettered the Olympic record in their first throws, with LaBorde's 48.23 metres the better of the two. Anderson responded with a 48.86 metres throw in the second set, then increased his new record again to 49.39 metres in the third and 49.49 metres in the fourth. This stood as the new record. All six of Anderson's throws topped the old record; three of LaBorde's four legal throws did, and Paul Winter (twice) and Jules Noël (once) both surpassed the old record as well.

Schedule

Results

References

Men's discus throw
Discus throw at the Olympics
Men's events at the 1932 Summer Olympics